Alisher Gulov (born 24 August 1989 in Dushanbe) is a Tajikistani taekwondo practitioner.  He competed in the +80 kg event at the 2012 Summer Olympics; he was defeated by Carlo Molfetta in the preliminary round and was eliminated by Liu Xiaobo in the repechage contest. 

He is also the current Vice-President of the Tajikistan Taekwondo Federation. In 2019 he coached several students to medals in the USA AAU National Championships.

References

External links

 

1989 births
Living people
Tajikistani male taekwondo practitioners
Olympic taekwondo practitioners of Tajikistan
Taekwondo practitioners at the 2012 Summer Olympics
Sportspeople from Dushanbe
Taekwondo practitioners at the 2010 Asian Games
Taekwondo practitioners at the 2014 Asian Games
Asian Games medalists in taekwondo
Asian Games bronze medalists for Tajikistan
Medalists at the 2014 Asian Games
Asian Taekwondo Championships medalists